Francesco Rossi (born 27 April 1991) is an Italian professional footballer who plays as a goalkeeper for  club Atalanta.

Club career
Rossi began his footballing career with Atalanta, playing in youth categories including Atalanta B.C. Primavera. In June 2009, he was promoted to first team to be a third-choice goalkeeper, and received the 91 jersey. Despite being at the club for over 15 years, Rossi has only made three appearances for the club, all of which were off the bench.

In July 2011, Rossi was loaned to Lumezzane, for one season, and he made his debut on 7 August, in a Coppa Italia match against Pro Patria. In the next phase, he stayed as a starter, and his team played against Torino, suffering a 1–0 away defeat and eventually knocked out of the Coppa Italia. However, in January 2012, his loan was terminated, and he joined Cuneo for the rest of the season. His loan was renewed for the 2012–13 season as well.

Rossi was signed by Pavia, Lupa Roma, Prato and Teramo in the 2013–14, 2014–15, 2015–16 and 2016–17 seasons respectively, all in temporary deals. In January 2017, he returned to his parent club and was assigned to the first team.

References

External links
Profile at the Atalanta B.C. website
 FIGC  
 

1991 births
Living people
People from Merate
Sportspeople from the Province of Lecco
Italian footballers
Footballers from Lombardy
Association football goalkeepers
Italy under-21 international footballers
Italy youth international footballers
Serie A players
Serie C players
Atalanta B.C. players
F.C. Lumezzane V.G.Z. A.S.D. players
A.C. Cuneo 1905 players
F.C. Pavia players
A.C. Prato players
S.S. Teramo Calcio players